In June 2009 Antigua and Barbuda became a formal member of the Bolivarian Alliance for the Americas (ALBA) international cooperation organization and the Caribbean oil alliance Petrocaribe. In 2009 Antigua and Barbuda received US$50 million from Venezuela. After American billionaire Allen Stanford's banks failed, Chávez sent financial assistance to Antigua and Barbuda, which was dependent on Stanford's investment when his business empire collapsed.

References 

Venezuela
Antigua and Barbuda